The 2016–17 Utah Runnin' Utes men's basketball team represented the University of Utah during the 2016–17 NCAA Division I men's basketball season. The team was led by sixth-year head coach Larry Krystkowiak. They played their home games at the Jon M. Huntsman Center in Salt Lake City, Utah as members of the Pac-12 Conference. They finished the season 20–12, 11–7 in Pac-12 play to finish in fourth place. They lost in the quarterfinals of the Pac-12 tournament to California. They received an invitation to the National Invitation Tournament where they lost in the first round to Boise State.

Previous season
The Utes finished the 2015–16 season 27–9, 13–5 in the Pac-12 play to finish in second place. In the Pac-12 tournament, the Utes defeated USC and California to advance to the championship game where they lost to Oregon. They received an at-large bid to the NCAA tournament, as a No. 3 seed in the Midwest Region. They beat Fresno State in the first round before losing in the No. 11-seed Gonzaga in the second round.

Off-season

Departures

Incoming transfers

2016 recruiting class

Roster

Dec. 12, 2016- Junior guard Tim Coleman elected to transfer after eight games into the season.

Schedule and results

|-
!colspan=12 style=| Non-conference regular season

|-
!colspan=12 style=| Pac-12 regular season

|-
!colspan=12 style=| Pac-12 tournament

|-
!colspan=12 style=| NIT

References

2016–17 Pac-12 Conference men's basketball season
2016-17 team
Utah
2016 in sports in Utah
2017 in sports in Utah